The 20th Central American Championships in Athletics were held at the Estadio Cementos Progreso in Guatemala City, Guatemala, between June 12–13, 2009.

A total of 40 events were contested, 21 by men and 19 by women.

Participation
A total of 163 athletes from 7 countries were reported to participate: 

 (10)
 (29)
 (34)
 (56)
 (15)
 (19)
 Panamá (1)

Medal summary
Complete results and medal winners were published.

Men

Women

Note
†: Event with no points for the team rankings because of the low number of participants.

Medal table (unofficial)

Team Rankings
Guatemala won the overall team ranking and the team
ranking in the men's category. Costa Rica won the team ranking in the women's
category

Total

Male

Female

References

 
Central American Championships in Athletics
Central American Championships in Athletics
Central American Championships in Athletics
Sport in Guatemala City
International athletics competitions hosted by Guatemala